"Please Don't Talk About Me When I'm Gone" is a song published in 1930. It was written by Sam H. Stept with lyrics by Sidney Clare. The original publication also credited singer Bee Palmer as co-composer.

Background
The lyrics are an admonishment between parting lovers, where the singer asks the other to either speak nicely of her, or not at all.

1931 recordings
Early hit versions in 1931 were by Gene Austin and Bert Lown.

Other notable recordings
  
Mose Allison – for his album Takes to the Hills (1961).
Barney Bigard – in the album Barney Bigard in Chronology 1944-1945.
Manteca Beat -–in the album Manteca-licious! (2007)
Harry Connick Jr. and Carmen McRae – included in the album 20 (1988).
Bing Crosby (1957)
Sammy Davis Jr. – included in the album The Sounds of '66 (1966).
Doris Day – in her album Lullaby of Broadway (1951).
Ella Fitzgerald – with Count Basie & His Orchestra, in the album A Perfect Match (1979).
Connie Francis – included in her album Connie & Clyde – Hit Songs of the 30s.
Bill Haley & His Comets – for the album Rockin' the Oldies (1957).
Billie Holiday – included in her album Velvet Mood (1956).
Helen Humes – for her album Songs I Like To Sing! (1961).
Jerry Lee Lewis – included in the compilation box set All Killer, No Filler: The Anthology issued in 1993.
Ann-Margret – for her album The Vivacious One (1962).
Dean Martin – for his album This Time I'm Swingin'! (1960).
Dean Martin and Robbie Williams – included in the album Forever Cool (2007)
Deana Martin – included on her album Volare, released in 2009 by Big Fish Records. 
The Mills Brothers with Tommy Dorsey and His Sentimentalists (1951).
Willie Nelson – for his album Moonlight Becomes You (1994).
Ray Price – included in the album Portrait of a Singer (1985).
The Original Rabbit Foot Spasm Band in 2009
Johnnie Ray (1953) This charted briefly in the No. 29 spot.
Leon Redbone – for his album Champagne Charlie (1978).
Piano Red – in the album Percussive Piano "Dr. Feelgood" (1976).
Rita Reys – included in the album Live at the Concertgebouw (1986).
Frank Sinatra – for his album Swing Along with Me (1961)
Kay Starr – included in her album Losers, Weepers (1960)
Ethel Waters – recorded February 10, 1931 for Columbia Records (catalog No. 2409D).
Bob Wills & His Texas Playboys – this can be found on the album The Tiffany Transcriptions Vol. 3: Basin Street Blues (1984).
Pete Seeger & Arlo Guthrie – on the 1981 live recorded album Precious Friend.

Film appearances

This song is sung by Norma Shearer's character Mary Haines in the 1939 film The Women as a joke when she leaves her girl friends alone at tea while she takes a call from her philandering husband Stephen Haines.
The song was used in the film House of Strangers (1949) when it was performed by Dolores Parker at the restaurant.
In the 1950 film The Breaking Point, it was sung by Patricia Neal at the bar.
In Lullaby of Broadway (1951), it was sung by Gladys George.
The song was also sung by the character Michigan J. Frog in the 1955 Warner Bros. animated short, One Froggy Evening.

In popular culture
Television anchor Edwin Newman sang the song during his hosting of Saturday Night Live in 1984.
Jamie Cullum also performed the song on the last Michael Parkinson chat show in December 2007.

References

Songs with music by Sam H. Stept
Songs with lyrics by Sidney Clare
1930 songs
Bill Haley songs
Ray Price (musician) songs
Billie Holiday songs